The Mayor of Sassari is an elected politician who, along with the Sassari's City Council, is accountable for the strategic government of Sassari in Sardinia, Italy. The current Mayor is Nanni Campus, a centre-right independent and former Mayor from 2000 to 2005, who was elected on 30 June 2019.

Overview
According to the Italian Constitution, the Mayor of Sassari is member of the City Council.

The Mayor is elected by the population of Sassari, who also elect the members of the City Council, controlling the Mayor's policy guidelines and is able to enforce his resignation by a motion of no confidence. The Mayor is entitled to appoint and release the members of his government.

Since 1995 the Mayor is elected directly by Sassari's electorate: in all mayoral elections in Italy in cities with a population higher than 15,000 the voters express a direct choice for the mayor or an indirect choice voting for the party of the candidate's coalition. If no candidate receives at least 50% of votes, the top two candidates go to a second round after two weeks. The election of the City Council is based on a direct choice for the candidate with a preference vote: the candidate with the majority of the preferences is elected. The number of the seats for each party is determined proportionally.

Italian Republic (since 1946)

City Council election (1946-1995)
From 1946 to 1995, the Mayor of Sassari was elected by the City's Council.

Direct election (since 1995)
Since 1995, under provisions of new local administration law, the Mayor of Sassari is chosen by direct election.

Timeline

References

Bibliography
 
 
 
 
 

Sassari
 
Politics of Sardinia
Sassari